Memorabilia – The Singles is a compilation album of songs by the British singer/songwriter Marc Almond, both as a solo artist and with his partner Dave Ball as the synthpop duo Soft Cell. It was released in 1991 and reached number eight in the UK Albums Chart. The album was promoted by the singles "Say Hello, Wave Goodbye '91" and "Tainted Love '91".

The majority of the Soft Cell singles on this compilation are not the original versions and have new re-recorded vocals and some new musical recordings and remixing, with the exception of "Torch" and "Soul Inside".

The version of "Soul Inside" is unique to this recording, as is "Tears Run Rings", which is an edited version of the Justin Strauss remix.

The compilation was partly assembled (by Stevo from Some Bizarre. While almost every Soft Cell single (to that date) was included in the package, the compilers opted to overlook all of Almond's solo and Mambas work up to 1988 except for his 1985 collaboration with Bronski Beat.

The compilation was released as an LP, CD, cassette and VHS video in May 1991.  The artwork was designed by Big-Active Limited with a cover photograph by Richard Haughton.

Track listing

LP

CD and cassette

Memorabilia – The Video Singles
A 14-track video compilation, Memorabilia – The Video Singles, was released with a slightly different track listing. "What" was accidentally left off the printed track listing on the outer cover of some releases of Memorabilia – The Video Singles, but is actually included on the videocassette itself.
"Memorabilia"
"Tainted Love '91"
"Bedsitter"
"Torch"
"What"
"Say Hello, Wave Goodbye '91"
"Soul Inside"
"Where the Heart Is"
"I Feel Love (Medley)"
"Tears Run Rings"
"A Love Spurned"
"Something's Gotten Hold of My Heart"
"The Stars We Are" (Annie Hogan, Marc Almond)
"Waifs and Strays"

References

Soft Cell albums
Marc Almond albums
1991 compilation albums